Sebastià de Victoria Emparán y Loyola was Bishop of Urgel and ex officio Co-Prince of Andorra from 1747 to 1756.

References

18th-century Princes of Andorra
Bishops of Urgell
Year of birth missing
Year of death unknown
18th-century Roman Catholic bishops in Spain